The Ghent Generating Station is a coal-fired power plant owned and operated by Kentucky Utilities near Ghent, Kentucky. It is located between Louisville, Kentucky and Cincinnati, Ohio. The plant is connected to the grid by numerous 138 and 345kv transmission lines.

Emissions data 
 2006  Emissions: 12,933,318 tons
 2006  Emissions: 49,913 tons
 2006  Emissions per MWh:
 2006  Emissions: 14,318 tons
 2005 Mercury Emissions: 413 lb.
 Coal Consumed daily: 14,000 tons

See also 

Coal mining in Kentucky

References

External links 
 

Energy infrastructure completed in 1973
Buildings and structures in Carroll County, Kentucky
Coal-fired power plants in Kentucky